The Marshall House is a historic house at 2009 Arch Street in Little Rock, Arkansas.  It is a two-story wood-frame house, covered by a hip roof with extended eaves showing exposed rafter ends.  A temple-front portico projects from the center of the main facade, with massive fluted Doric columns supporting a fully pedimented and modillioned gable. It was built in 1908, from designs by Charles L. Thompson.

The house was added to the National Register of Historic Places in 1982.  It was selected as the most representative home built in 1908 in this region as part of the nationwide competition sponsored by the National Association of Realtors in honor of its Diamond Jubilee 75th Anniversary.

See also
National Register of Historic Places listings in Little Rock, Arkansas

References

Houses on the National Register of Historic Places in Arkansas
Houses completed in 1908
Houses in Little Rock, Arkansas
National Register of Historic Places in Little Rock, Arkansas
Historic district contributing properties in Arkansas
1908 establishments in Arkansas